The Tenth One in Hiding is a 1989 Italian drama film directed by Lina Wertmüller. It was screened in the Un Certain Regard section at the 1989 Cannes Film Festival.

Cast
 Piera Degli Esposti - Marcella
 Dominique Sanda - Landlady
 Hartmut Becker - Landlord
 Susanna Marcomeni - Cesira
 Giorgio Trestini - Tognone

References

External links

1989 films
Italian drama films
1980s Italian-language films
1989 drama films
Films based on works by Giovannino Guareschi
Films directed by Lina Wertmüller
1980s Italian films